Sania Ashiq Jabeen is a Pakistani politician who had been a member of the Provincial Assembly of the Punjab from August 2018 till January 2023.

Early life and education

She was born and raised in Lahore, Pakistan in Arain family.

She has received a degree of Pharmacy-D (Doctor of Pharmacy) from the University of Punjab.

Political career
She was elected to the Provincial Assembly of the Punjab as a candidate of Pakistan Muslim League (N) (PML-N) on a reserved seat for women in 2018 Pakistani general election. At the age of 25, she became the youngest member of the Punjab Assembly to be elected in 2018 general election.

Fake Video Scam

Pakistan Muslim League-N MPA Sania Ashiq from Punjab became the victim of a fake leaked video  scam. The forensic report of an ‘objectionable’ video, doing rounds on social media, and being attributed to Sania Ashiq has shown that actually the video was not that of Sania but of Lahore’s Jinnah Hospital’s nurse which had been made by a doctor of the same hospital who had later been arrested by the police. On October 26, PML-N MPA Sania Ashiq had filed a petition in the FIA Cyber Crime Wing Pakistan, in which she said that a video was shared on TikTok and other social media platforms.

References

Living people
Punjabi people
Pakistan Muslim League (N) MPAs (Punjab)
Punjab MPAs 2018–2023
Women members of the Provincial Assembly of the Punjab
21st-century Pakistani women politicians
1993 births